was a professional wrestling event promoted by World Wonder Ring Stardom. The event took place on June 26, 2022, in Nagoya, Japan at the Nagoya International Conference Hall, with a limited attendance due in part to the ongoing COVID-19 pandemic at the time.

Background
The show featured six professional wrestling matches that resulted from scripted storylines, where wrestlers portrayed villains, heroes, or less distinguishable characters in the scripted events that built tension and culminated in a wrestling match or series of matches. The press conference for the event was held on June 7, 2022 and was broadcast on Stardom's YouTube channel.

Event
The preshow match was broadcast on Stardom's YouTube channel. Ruaka defeated Cosmic Angels' Unagi Sayaka and Waka Tsukiyama in a three-way match. During the preshow transmission, a masked silhouette was shown attacking Saya Kamitani and Rossy Ogawa in a hallway. The second match saw Momo Kohgo and Saya Iida defeating Lady C & Miyu Amasaki in a tag team match. The third match had Himeka picking a victory over Mina Shirakawa. Saki Kashima, Momo Watanabe & Starlight Kid retained the Artist of Stardom Championship in the three-way elimination tag team match against Donna Del Mondo's Giulia, Maika & Mai Sakurai, and God's Eye's World of Stardom Champion Syuri, Ami Sourei & Mirai. The fifth match saw Tam Nakano and Natsupoi fighting in the first-ever steel cage match held by Stardom, continuing a feud that started long ago at Stardom Yokohama Dream Cinderella 2021 on April 4 when Natsupoi unsuccessfully challenged Nakano for the Wonder of Stardom Championship.

The main event had the SWA World Champion Mayu Iwatani and the Goddess of Stardom Champions Koguma & Hazuki taking on Utami Hayashishita, the Wonder of Stardom Champion Saya Kamitani, and the High Speed Champion AZM in a steel cage match in which the last member to fail to escape the cage was AZM who attracted her team's loss. After their victory, Iwatani, Koguma & Hazuki challenged Starlight Kid, Momo Watanabe & Saki Kashima for the Artist of Stardom Championship on further notice. Kid came out to accept the challenge.

Results

Notes

References

External links
Page Stardom World

2022 in professional wrestling
World Wonder Ring Stardom shows
Events in Nagoya
Professional wrestling in Japan